Jonio is an underground station on Line B of the Rome Metro. It is located in the Monte Sacro quarter, under the intersection between Viale Jonio and Via Scarpanto. The station was opened on 21 April 2015.

References

External links

Rome Metro Line B stations
Railway stations opened in 2015
2015 establishments in Italy
Rome Q. XVI Monte Sacro
Railway stations in Italy opened in the 21st century